The Menalamba rebellion was an uprising in Madagascar by the Sakalava people that emerged in central Madagascar in response to the French capture of the royal palace in the capital city of Antananarivo in September 1895. it spread rapidly in 1896, threatening the capital, but French forces were successful in securing the surrender of many rebel groups in 1897. Elements of the rebellion continued sporadically until 1903.

Background
French diplomatic and military claims over the island of Madagascar - ongoing for more than four decades - intensified under the reigns of Queen Ranavalona II and Queen Ranavalona III, the island's final monarchs. Following a successful campaign under General Jacques Duchesne, France officially annexed Madagascar on January 1, 1896. That August, the French declared Madagascar to be their colony and exiled Malagasy Prime Minister Rainilaiarivony to Algiers (in Algeria) where he died the following year. Queen Ranavalona III and much of her administration remained but were afforded no real political power. A civil governor, Hippolyte Laroche, was initially appointed to administer the territory.

Outbreak

In December 1895, two months after the French capture of Antananarivo, popular resistance to French rule emerged in the form of the menalamba ("red shawl") uprising, principally conducted by common peasants who wore shawls smeared with the red laterite soil of the highlands. This guerrilla war against foreigners, Christianity, and political corruption, quickly spread throughout the island. The rebellion did not seek to restore the authority of the queen, as the conversion of the leading members of the royal family was regarded by the rebels as the cause of cosmic chaos. The rebellion was based in peripheral regions far from the capital, already the abode of brigands, runaway slaves and deserters. One if its main motivations was the restoration of traditional ancestor veneration. Another was the rejection of corvee labour (fanompoana), on which had become increasingly common in the Malagasy political order and which the church promoted and relied on.

The rebellion broke out only a few days after the French took Antananarivo. It began spontaneously in multiple centres and lacked any unified leadership or coordination. Lacking central coordination, as the revolt developed it encompassed both religious traditionalists and popular Christian preachers, and although it rejected the corrupt old political order, it maintained links with the palace. it also involved both Merina people and members of other ethnic groups.

The scale and danger of the rebellion was not immediately obvious to the French, who at first they were only dealing with isolated outbreaks of violence. However in March 1896 a full-scale uprising began, taking them by surprise. The indication that something different was happening was a wave of coordinated attacks on administrative posts of the Malagasy royal government in that month.

Members of Ranavalona's court were accused of encouraging the rebels and on October 15th 1896, General Joseph Gallieni executed the queen's uncle Ratsimamanga (brother of her favored adviser, Ramisindrazana) and her Minister of War, Rainandriamampandry. Ramisindrazana, the queen's aunt, was exiled to Réunion in 1897, because the French colonial administration was reluctant to execute a woman.

The resistance led the government of France to replace the island's civil governor with Gallieni as the military governor.  It was also a principal factor in the decision to exile Ranavalona to Réunion later that same year.

The height of the rebellion

At its height, the rebellion may have controlled territory with as many as 300,000 people. The rebels were able to impose a blockade on Antananarivo in July, August and September 1896, and in the latter month, a state of siege was declared in the capital.

There was a belief among some of the rebels - particularly Protestants, that the British would arrive to support them against the French. However, this hope for support never materialised and by 1897 hunger was forcing rebel groups to negotiate for surrender. One, in the north of the country, led by Rabezavana, surrendered to Hubert Lyautey in May 1897.

Suppression

The resistance movement was mostly put down by the French military by 1900, although revolts continued in west, northwest and east Madagascar until 1903.

The rebellion destroyed hundreds of churches and killed an unknown number of Malagasy religious figures as well as five foreign missionaries. Jacques Berthieu, a Jesuit priest executed by the rebellion, was declared a martyr and saint of the Catholic Church in 2012.

The number of Malagasy deaths as a result of the rebellion may have reached 100,000, while French deaths - from disease as well as violent causes - were in the hundreds.

References

Bibliography

History of Madagascar
Wars involving Madagascar
French Madagascar
Rebellions in Africa
Resistance to the French colonial empire
Conflicts in 1895
19th-century rebellions
African resistance to colonialism